There Is No Other Way may refer to:

"There Is No Other Way" (Desperate Housewives), a television episode
"There's No Other Way", a song by Blur
"There Is No Other Way", a song written by Stephen Sondheim, from the musical Pacific Overtures
"There Is No Other Way", a song by Dolo Coker from Third Down

See also
 There is no alternative, a slogan used by Margaret Thatcher